Marco John (born 2 April 2002) is a German professional footballer who plays as a midfielder for  club Greuther Fürth, on loan from 1899 Hoffenheim.

Career
John made his professional debut for 1899 Hoffenheim in the UEFA Europa League on 3 December 2020, starting in the home match against Serbian SuperLiga side Red Star Belgrade.

On 26 August 2022, John moved to Greuther Fürth on a season-long loan.

References

External links
 
 
 
 

2002 births
Living people
People from Heilbronn (district)
Sportspeople from Stuttgart (region)
Footballers from Baden-Württemberg
German footballers
Germany under-21 international footballers
Germany youth international footballers
Association football midfielders
TSG 1899 Hoffenheim II players
TSG 1899 Hoffenheim players
SpVgg Greuther Fürth players
Bundesliga players
Regionalliga players
21st-century German people